Summerville  is a small community in the Canadian province of Nova Scotia, located in  The Municipality of the District of West Hants in Hants County. As of 2015, the population of Summerville was estimated to be 248.

History 

The identities of the Acadians who settled this community prior to the Expulsion of the Acadians are unknown.

After the American Revolution, Summerville, Hants County was first settled by American Loyalists Captain John Robert Grant.

A large wharf was built at Summerville in the late 19th century to export gypsum. It was also used to repair ships and later became a vessel graveyard for old sailing ships converted to gypsum barges. Trace of the hulls of several of these large sailing vessels may still be seen at low tide, including the hull of the Barque Hamburg, the largest barque ever built in Canada.

Notable people
 William Hall (VC) – Summerville born winner of the Victoria Cross during the Indian rebellion of 1857. Hall was the first black person as well as the first Nova Scotian to receive the award.

Climate

Restaurant

A small restaurant and inn is operated in Summerville, originally called "The Avon Emporium" and "Shipright Inn", respectively. In February 2014 "the emporium" as many locals called it was bought by the owners of "The Flying Apron", relocating from Tantallon, NS.

Shuffleboard Team
Since 2007, Summerville has been the home of the Summerville Daryns who practice and play in the area.

References

Endnotes

Sources
T. Watson Smith. Loyalist History: John Grant. Acadiensis 1903. pp. 6–18
 Edith Mosher. Land of a Loyalist [:The Story of John Grant]. (1988, Lancelot Press)
 Bergen Family History – History of John Grant and wife Sarah Bergen

External links
Summerville on Destination Nova Scotia

 Summerville, Nova Scotia

Communities in Hants County, Nova Scotia
General Service Areas in Nova Scotia